Sven Pettersson (July 24, 1927 – April 19, 2017) was a Swedish ski jumper who competed in the 1950s. He finished fifth in the individual large hill at the 1956 Winter Olympics in Cortina d'Ampezzo. He was born in Härnösand.

References

External links

1927 births
2017 deaths
People from Härnösand Municipality
Swedish male ski jumpers
Olympic ski jumpers of Sweden
Ski jumpers at the 1956 Winter Olympics
Sportspeople from Västernorrland County